Andrius Balys Tapinas (born 6 April 1977) is a Lithuanian journalist. Tapinas is the anchor of a long-running popular Lithuanian TV programme The Money Generation. He has also launched his own online TV channel on YouTube called "Freedom TV", which has proven to be a great success. Along with the "Freedom Group", Andrius has completed multiple fundraising campaigns during the COVID-19 pandemic, as well as the 2021 Lithuanian migration crisis. He hosted the "Freedom Chain" from Vilnius to Belarus border during 2020 Belarusian protests.

Personal life 

Tapinas had been married to Rasa Tapinienė (divorced in 2019), a news anchor on LRT, and they have two children.

Bibliography

The Steam and Stone Saga 

 Hour of the Wolf
 Day of the Plague
 Hour of the Wolf. Sidabras (comic book, writer)

Honours
 : Knight Cross of the Order for Merits to Lithuania (2017)
 : Order of Merit (2022)

See also
:lt:Laikykitės ten su Andriumi Tapinu

References

External links 

 
 Tapinas' official blog
 Tapinas' TV programme website
 Hour of the Wolf Lithuanian website
 Andrius Tapinas webpage at Goodreads 

1977 births
Journalists from Vilnius
Lithuanian male writers
Lithuanian television presenters
Lithuanian novelists
Lithuanian translators
Lithuanian poker players
Steampunk writers
Vilnius University alumni
Living people